Monte Rey is a subbarrio, a legal subdivision of Pueblo, a barrio in San Juan, Puerto Rico.  It was, at one time, a subdivision of Río Piedras, a former municipality of Puerto Rico.

References

Pueblo, San Juan, Puerto Rico
Municipality of San Juan